Glenn Ignatius Liebhardt (July 31, 1910 – March 14, 1992) was a Major League Baseball pitcher who played for three seasons. He played for the Philadelphia Athletics in 1930 and the St. Louis Browns in 1936 and 1938.

Glenn's father, Glenn John Liebhardt, was also a major league pitcher.

See also
List of second-generation Major League Baseball players

External links

1910 births
1992 deaths
Major League Baseball pitchers
Philadelphia Athletics players
St. Louis Browns players
Baseball players from Cleveland